The women's singles badminton event at the 2011 Pan American Games was held from October 15–20 at the Multipurpose Gymnasium in Guadalajara. The defending Pan American Games champion was Eva Lee of the United States, while the defending Pan American Championship champion was Cee Nantana Ketpura, also of the United States.

The athletes were drawn into an elimination stage draw. Once a team lost a match it was no longer able to compete. The draw for the competition was done on October 7, 2011.

Seeds

  (champion)
  (quarterfinals)
  (finals)
  (semifinals)
   (semifinals)
  (quarterfinals)
  (quarterfinals)
  (third round)

Results

Finals

Top Half

Section 1

Section 2

Bottom Half

Section 3

Section 4

References

External links
 Badminton women's draw

Women's Singles